Lucy Clare D'Orsi,  (née Copson; born December 1969) is a British police officer. Since March 2021, she has served as chief constable of British Transport Police. She was deputy assistant commissioner in the Metropolitan Police Service, with responsibility for the Protection Command.

Early life and family
Lucy D'Orsi was born Lucy Copson in Leicester, in December 1969. She married Raffaele D'Orsi in Leicester in 1993. Raffaele was a detective superintendent and deputy borough commander for policing in the Royal Borough of Kensington and Chelsea. In 2004, Lucy and Raffaele D'Orsi were thanked by author Lynda La Plante for their advice on police procedures for her novel Above Suspicion.

Career
D'Orsi joined the Metropolitan Police Service in 1992. She was in charge of the police response to London's largest fire of 2006, in Beaufort Park, Hendon, and has headed special operations relating to illegal weapons. She moved from Enfield to be chief superintendent and borough commander in Hammersmith and Fulham from March 2011 to March 2014 after which she was promoted to commander in East London.

In 2015, D'Orsi was in charge of security during the visit of Chinese leader Xi Jinping to the United Kingdom which was regarded on the British official side as a very difficult visit to arrange as in negotiations the Chinese delegation had wanted their security officials to be able to carry guns and for all anti-Chinese protests to be banned, neither of which demands was agreed to by the Metropolitan Police. During the visit, however, three protestors were arrested and their homes searched resulting in criticism that legitimate protests had been blocked and the response to the protests "heavy handed". In a blogpost written in her official capacity in 2015, D'Orsi rejected accusations that the policing of protests during the visit had been subject to political interference, saying "The policing of the state visit was a matter for the Metropolitan Police Service and any other suggestion is wrong". 

D'Orsi was recommended for a commendation for her work during the visit but did not receive it because her performance was seen as part of the natural duties of her role. In May 2016, Queen Elizabeth II was filmed remarking that the Chinese "were very rude to the ambassador", and that it was "bad luck" for D'Orsi to be responsible for security during the visit.

On 3 December 2020, the British Transport Police Authority announced that D'Orsi would be the next chief constable of the British Transport Police. She took over the role from February 2021.

D'Orsi was awarded the Queen's Police Medal (QPM) in the 2021 Birthday Honours.

Honours

References 

Living people
Metropolitan Police chief officers
British Chief Constables
1969 births
People from Leicester
Women Metropolitan Police officers
English recipients of the Queen's Police Medal
Alumni of Sheffield Hallam University